Teucrium scorodonia, common name the woodland germander or wood sage, is a species of flowering plant in the genus Teucrium of the family Lamiaceae. It is native to Western Europe and Tunisia, but cultivated in many places as an ornamental plant in gardens, and naturalized in several regions (New Zealand, Azores, and a few locales in North America).

Description
Teucrium scorodonia reaches on average  of height. It is a hairy herbaceous perennial with erect and branched stems. The leaves are petiolate, irregularly toothed, triangular-ovate to oblong shaped, lightly wrinkled. The inflorescence is composed by one-sided (all flowers "look" at the same side) pale green or yellowish flowers bearing four  stamens with reddish or violet filaments. These flowers grow in the axils of the upper leaves and are hermaphrodite, tomentose and bilabiate but lack an upper lip, as all  Teucrium ones. The flowering period extends from June through August. These plants are mainly pollinated by Hymenoptera species.

Subspecies
 Teucrium scorodonia subsp. baeticum (Boiss. & Reut.) Tutin
 Teucrium scorodonia subsp. euganeum (Vis.) Arcang

Habitat

Gallery

References

 Pignatti S. - Flora d'Italia - Edagricole – 1982 Vol. II, pg. 443
 
 Pink, A. - |Project Gutenberg Literary Archive Foundation - Gardening for the Million

External links
Biolib
Flora of Northern Ireland: Teucrium scorodonia
[http://luirig.altervista.org/schedeit2/pz/teucrium_scorodonia.htm T. scorodonia]

scorodonia
Herbs
Flora of Europe
Flora of Tunisia
Garden plants of Europe
Medicinal plants
Groundcovers
Plants described in 1753
Taxa named by Carl Linnaeus